Waialae or Waialae may refer to:
Waialae Country Club, a private country club in Honolulu, Hawaii
Waialae, Hawaii,  a section of Honolulu, Hawaii alongside Kāhala
Waialae Stream, a small river on Hawaii